Drzęczewo Drugie  is a village in the administrative district of Gmina Piaski, within Gostyń County, Greater Poland Voivodeship, in west-central Poland.

References

Villages in Gostyń County